Boon is a British television drama series made by Central Independent Television, seven series and two specials were produced and was broadcast on ITV between 1986 and 1995. It was created by Jim Hill and Bill Stair, and it starred Michael Elphick, David Daker, Neil Morrissey, Elizabeth Carling, Amanda Burton, Saskia Wickham, Rachel Davies, Lesley- Anne Sharpe and Brigit Forsyth. It centres around Ken Boon (Elphick), an ex fireman who becomes a freelance troubleshooter after he is encouraged by his former colleague Harry Crawford (Daker) to take on extra work. As Ken becomes more experienced in this role, he gradually becomes a private investigator which eventually turns into a full time occupation. Meanwhile, Harry takes on a number of business endeavours including Bar Owner, Hotelier and Ballroom Manager; by Series 5 he collaborates with Ken to set up a new business, Crawford Boon Security where Harry organizes the security operations, whilst Ken oversees private investigations; frequently there paths cross and they assist each other with their endeavours. They are assisted by a number of characters including Rocky Cassidy (Morrissey), Laura Marsh (Carling), Margaret Daly (Burton), Alex Wilton (Wickham), Doreen Evans (Davies), Debbie Yates (Sharpe) and Helen Yeldman (Forsyth). The series was originally set in Birmingham, before changing location to Nottingham in Series 4 when Central moved production to their new studios in the area.

Series overview

Episodes

Series 1 (1986) 
The first series is primarily set at the Grand, a seedy little hotel in Birmingham, West Midlands. Much of the first series sees Ken offering his services for odd jobs as a means of supplementing his finances towards the funding of The Ponderossa, a market garden which he has set up in a village ten miles outside of Birmingham. Ken is soon offered a variety of jobs, from child minding to piloting a canal boat along the Grand Union Canal. He soon develops an interest as a private detective and gradually promotes himself as a freelance troubleshooter. Although this series was filmed on location around Birmingham, most of the interiors were filmed in the studio at Central's facilities in Broad Street, Birmingham;  and in contrast to subsequent series which were entirely filmed on location, this series used a mixture of interiors shot on videotape, and exteriors shot on 16mm film; which was a practice that was still common place in TV production at the time.

Series 2 (1987) 
Several months have now passed and Harry has gone up in the world, having purchased a larger, swankier hotel, the Coaching Inn within the affluent town of Edgbaston. Since Ken helped with the sale of the hotel, he repays him by offering him lodgings in a room above the former stable buildings. Ken turns the stables into a base for a new courier firm, Texas Rangers. This series sees new employees Rocky Cassidy and Debbie Yates join the firm. Rocky is initially employed as a courier but he later becomes a helpful sidekick and associate to Ken as he assists him with his investigations. During the ensuing episodes, Ken and Rocky are involved in wide range of situations whilst out delivering packages, from clashing with unscrupulous property developers, unwittingly assisting credit card smugglers and uncovering smuggling rings. Harry also has his fare share of issues to deal with as he tries to run the hotel, from experiencing a police raid after a pornographic film unit utilize his premises, reported incidents of food poisoning among some guests, mislaying a large cache of money and a theft at an Irish gypsy wedding. This series was filmed entirely on location, and unlike the previous series it was shot completely on film, a production practice which would also be carried over into the following series as well. Uniquely, this was also the only series that was split into two half series which were aired over two transmission blocks, whereas all the other series were shown in complete 13 week runs.

Series 3 (1988-1989) 
Harry has now sold the Coaching Inn, and has brought the Plaza Suite, a ballroom in Edgbaston. Meanwhile, Ken has returned to work at Texas Rangers following a long convalescence and is running his business from an office at the Plaza Suite. Later whilst Ken is on the lookout for Richard Jay, a businessman who has robbed the proceeds from a charity event which he was organizing with Harry; he is reunited with Margaret who has since left the police force due to disciplinary action following the events of the hostage situation at the end of the previous series. She is now trying to run a private investigation agency from home, whilst trying to manage her rebellious teenage daughter Jo. After Ken helps Margaret solve one of her investigations, she praises his skills as a private detective and they decide to go into partnership together in the form of Boon-Daly Investigations (BDI), otherwise known as Beady Eye. Through their investigations they investigate and track down various suspects, from ex-husbands accused of cheating on alimony payments, a former spy being hounded by the press, a runaway former rock star supposedly accused of assault, a career criminal duping them into providing a false alibi whilst a robbery is taking place and an egg smuggling gang who are targeting a rare sheep farmer. This was the third and final series to be filmed in Birmingham, before Central moved production to their new studios in Nottingham following this series. Like the previous series, filming was done on entirely on location although this was the last series to be shot exclusively on film, the production of the show would switch entirely to videotape from the following series onwards.

Series 4 (1989) 
Following Margaret and Jo's departure for the US, Ken dissolves their partnership and moves to Nottingham to start up a new detective agency, Boon Investigations; located in a small office down the road from Nottingham Castle. Since he is working alone, Ken often struggles with his workload, his cases included tracking down an army deserter who has got involved in illegal boxing, acting as minder for a wayward local radio DJ who has a tendency for booze, investigating a meat packing factory which doubles up as a front for smuggling illicit goods into the UK, uncovering an insurance scam involving a sterile racing horse whose medical certificate was forged, and bringing to justice a crooked casino owner who uses dodgy businesses practices including blackmail and subterfuge in order to put a rival gambling club out of business. He is assisted in his investigations by Laura Marsh who doubles up as his secretary and personal assistant, who joins his firm at the beginning of the series; she proves to be a valuable aide with her skills in deduction and uncovering evidence, which  helps further Ken's investigations. Meanwhile, Harry has sold the Plaza Suite and has also moved from Birmingham, where he goes into partnership with widow Helen Yeldman to manage Woodcote Park, a hotel and country club situated within the Nottinghamshire countryside. He has grandiose plans to turn place into a renowned venue for sporting tournaments including polo, tennis and golf, along with hosting themed evenings, stand-up comedy nights and organizing meetings for various clubs and organisations. Rocky later joins them after returning from Birmingham when Texas Rangers goes into liquidation, he occasionally assists Ken and Laura with their inquiries and also does odd jobs around Woodcote Park. Production of the show had now moved to Central's new studio facilities at Lenton Lane in Nottingham, which facilitated a change of location for this series; alike the previous two series it was filmed entirely on location, however from this series onwards it was shot completely on videotape, as a means of cutting down on production costs. Moreover, the title sequences would continue to be shot on film, this practice would continue up until the end of Series 6.

Series 5 (1990) 
The series begins with Harry trying to set up a security firm after selling Woodcote Park. Operating from an office situated nearby the River Trent, at first he struggles to raise capital. But his fortunes change when he is reunited with Ken, and they join up and form Crawford Boon Security (CBS) with Harry organizing security engagements and Ken managing private investigations. They run into wide range of clients and situations, usually at the locations where they have been hired to arrange security for. Ranging from tracking down a missing pupil from a boarding school, investigating a case of rivalry between two building firms, helping two ballet dancers bring their unscrupulous agent and his accomplice to justice and uncovering a counterfeit forgery racket. At times their company frequently gets into trouble, such as having their contract to guard a derelict church scrapped after a series of vandalism attacks. This often puts Ken at odds with Harry, who disagree on the best approach to restore their companies reputation and unmask the real culprits behind the unscrupulous activities they get caught up in. From this series onwards, CBS becomes the main focus of Ken and Harry's business endeavors. Ken also lives near the offices, at first in yacht by the canal basin, and later in a canal boat after the former was sunk by two heavies employed by a local crook, the canal boat remains his residence for the duration of this series.

Series 6 (1991) 
Harry and Ken continue to run Crawford Boon Security which sees its trade and reputation go from strength to strength, despite its earlier setbacks. Meanwhile, Ken has moved out of his canal boat and is now lodging at a derelict cottage, which he has agreed with the landlord to renovate in return for living there rent free. The restoration of Ken's cottage continues to be an ongoing theme throughout the course of this series, but he is continuously beset with a number of setbacks when he finds himself inundated with cases, ranging from dealing with a pair of drugs traffickers who steal drugs from the local hospital, bringing to justice a corrupt landlord who uses unscrupulous tactics to force out his tenants in return for a lucrative property deal, finding himself in the middle of an ongoing quarrel between the local gentry and a sheep farmer over land rights, investigating a lawyer who used deceitful tricks in order to successfully push through a libel case and protecting a family from a vengeful ex convict who is demands his rightful share of the proceeds from an earlier robbery. The relationship between Ken and Harry develops further through this series, for instance when they find themselves locked in a vault, they reminisce about their past life in the fire service and mull about the meaning of life; and later on they find out that living together is not as easy as working together, when they are assigned to look after a stately home. Increasingly they start look out for each other, for instance when Harry tries prevent Ken from being swindled by an ex lover when it turns out she is a seasoned con artist; Ken returns the favor by saving Harry from being hoodwinked by an alluring woman when it turns out she is using him in order to arrange a robbery at a facility CBS have been hired to guard. Although the series was filmed entirely on location as of the previous few series; for the episode 'Two Men in a Vault', the scenes set inside the vault were filmed at Central's studios in Nottingham. This series was the first to be filmed in NICAM stereo, moreover the opening titles for this series were the last to be shot on film and also the last to be overseen by its co-creator Bill Stair, who died in May 1991, a few months before the transmission of this series.

Christmas Special (1991) 
In addition to the Sixth series, Central also commissioned a 90-minute Christmas special which was to air on Christmas Eve. It was intended to be one of the focal points of ITV's Christmas schedule, that year alone ITV invested £38 million in their programs over the Christmas schedule  which included special episodes for the likes of Taggart, The Darling Buds of May, Minder and Sherlock Holmes, as a means of tackling competition from the BBC. This was not the first episode to be set during the Christmas period, however this was only feature length standalone episode that was commissioned and produced during the show's existence. This episode was dedicated to the series co-creator Bill Stair who died earlier that year in May 1991, furthermore this episode is also notable for featuring the final appearance of supporting character Laura Marsh played by Elizabeth Carling, who had stayed on for three series since beginning of Series 4 back in 1989. She departed owing to commitments for a UK tour of The Rocky Horror Picture Show.

Series 7 (1992) 
CBS has been thrown into chaos when Laura announces her resignation and leaves to take up a new position in Manchester. Alex Wilton approaches Harry for the role of secretary which he readily accepts since Ken is currently investigating her for the suspected case of stealing industrial secrets from her former employers. It soon turns out that Alex is an ex convict who was imprisoned for cheque fraud, Ken utilizes her skills as he finds them to be a useful addition to his investigations and a bond soon develops between them which later becomes romantic by the series end. In this final series, Ken encounters a number of investigations from dealing with cases of vandalism at a luxury rural retreat, protecting a housewife from her abusive husband, investigating the case of kidnapped child, acting as a minder for a businessman who turns out to be a money launderer and going undercover at a rehabilitation hostel in order to infiltrate a criminal gang who are planning a robbery. There are also significant development for Harry in this series, from being suspected by the police of getting himself and others involved in a dodgy property scheme, to masquerading as a private detective in order to investigate the robbery of a priceless piece of porcelain. These events help shape Harry's outlook on life, he soon makes a life changing decision after he meets Mary O'Haren and he announces to Ken that intends on settling down with her and retiring from the security business, thus putting an end to his and Ken's long standing partnership. Rocky is also given more to do in this series, at one point he becomes suspected of stealing jewelry from the company's safe and resigns in disgust, inadvertently leading to a strike over the security workers who protest over his 'unfair dismissal'. The title sequence for this series, now shot on videotape provides a retrospective feel on the show's past by containing clips from title sequences from earlier series, along with other significant moments in Ken's career as a private investigator.

Special (1995) 
Although advertised as a special one off last ever episode, it was in fact a standard episode from Series 7 that was held off from transmission since it was made in 1992, and contains no references to Ken's developing romantic relationship with Alex or Harry's resignation from CBS at the end of the respective series, which sets this episode before the events of 'Shot in the Dark'. Although rumoured to be the first episode of an aborted Series 8  due to Elphick's commitments with the first series of Harry, or postponed by ITV due to scheduling issues with the number of episodes at the time, those theories failed to be substantiated further. It was delayed due to the fact that this episode failed to be completed in time for transmission and had to be postponed until the network could find a suitable slot.

References

External links 
  
 
 Boon at UKTV Drama  
 Boon at TVDB

Boon